Zoea was the name of at least two ships of the Italian Navy and may refer to:

 , a  launched in 1913 and discarded in 1918.
 , a  launched in 1937 and discarded in 1947.

Italian Navy ship names